The MOD alliance consisted of the Marehan, Ogaden and Dhulbahante tribes which formed the backbone of Siad Barre's military regime. Despite Barre's anti-clannism rhetoric, this cabal of clans who supported the Somalian regime where extended families of the president and were a part of the Darod family. Marehan had the lion's share, Ogaden had the leopard's share and Dhulbahante had the hyena's share.

References 

Darod

History of Somalia
Siad Barre
Somali Civil War